The Ambassador of Australia to Venezuela is an officer of the Australian Department of Foreign Affairs and Trade and the head of the Embassy of the Commonwealth of Australia to the Bolivarian Republic of Venezuela. The ambassador resides in Santiago, Chile. The current ambassador, since February 2020, is Todd Mercer.

The Australian Government established an embassy in Caracas in 1979 and appointed its first resident ambassador, A. D. Brown. Previously, responsibility for Australian diplomatic representation in Venezuela was held in Brazil (1973–1974) and then Peru (1974–1979). The Australian Embassy in Caracas was closed in 2002.

List of ambassadors

References

Venezuela
Australia